The 2005 Tuvalu A-Division (also known as the 2005 National Provident Fund Championship League) is the fifth season of association football competition in Tuvalu. The champions were Nauti FC.

Football in Tuvalu is played at club and national team level. The Tuvalu national football team draws from players in the Tuvalu A-Division; the national team competes in the Pacific Games and South Pacific Games. The national team is controlled by the Tuvalu National Football Association (TNFA).

Clubs 
All listed teams apparently represent atolls, with the exception of Amatuku (an island on Funafuti atoll); the atolls Nukulaelae and Niulakita apparently did not enter.

Standings

Top scorers

References 

Tuvalu A-Division seasons
Tuvalu
football